Myelois multiflorella is a species of snout moth. It is found from Sicily, Romania and Bulgaria east to Mongolia.

References

Moths described in 1887
Phycitini
Moths of Europe